German submarine U-122 was a Type IXB U-boat of Nazi Germany's Kriegsmarine that operated during World War II.

She was ordered on 15 December 1937 and was laid down on 5 March 1939 at DeSchiMAG AG Weser, Bremen, becoming yard number 954. She was launched on 20 December 1939 and commissioned under her first and only commander, Korvettenkapitän Hans-Günther Looff on 30 March 1940.

Design
German Type IXB submarines were slightly larger than the original German Type IX submarines, later designated IXA. U-122 had a displacement of  when at the surface and  while submerged. She had two shafts and two  propellers.

U-122 was fitted with six  torpedo tubes (four fitted at the bow and two at the stern), 22 torpedoes, one  SK C/32 naval gun, 180 rounds, and a  SK C/30 as well as a  C/30 anti-aircraft gun. The boat had a complement of forty-eight.

Service history

She carried out two combat patrols with the 2nd U-boat Flotilla. On her first foray in May 1940, she transported an 88 mm Flak (anti-aircraft gun) with ammunition, some bombs, 90 cbm (some ) of fuel for aircraft and some motor oil to Trondheim during the Norwegian campaign. On 23 May she encountered an enemy submarine in the North Atlantic, but neither boat attacked each other.

She was declared missing with all hands after 22 June 1940 between the North Sea and the Bay of Biscay. She may have collided with the vessel San Felipe on 22 June, or been sunk by depth charges from the corvette  on 23 June.

Some Dutch and Polish authors suggest that U-122 was sunk after being rammed by the submarine ORP Wilk on 20 June soon after midnight. The first officer of Wilk reported in his memoirs ramming a surfaced U-boat while it was attempting to dive. This version was often disputed and an alternative theory states that Wilk instead rammed and sank the Dutch submarine O-13, or most probably, a minefield protector buoy rather than a submarine. Moreover, the U-122 sank the SS Empire Conveyor during the day following the Wilk's collision, and she was too far away then, and reported her position for the last time on 21 June.

Summary of raiding history

References

Bibliography

External links

German Type IX submarines
U-boats commissioned in 1940
U-boats sunk in 1940
World War II submarines of Germany
World War II shipwrecks in the Atlantic Ocean
Missing U-boats of World War II
Missing submarines of World War II
1939 ships
Ships built in Bremen (state)
U-boats sunk by unknown causes
Maritime incidents in June 1940